Sveriges Handelskalendar, was a Swedish journal,  business directory, which began publication in 1859.
It was published by Albert Bonnier.

See also
Rudolf Wall

Albert Bonnier

Bisnode

References

Mass media in Sweden